Daniela Maier (born 4 March 1996) is a German freestyle skier who competed at the 2022 Winter Olympics.

Career
Maier competed at the 2015 FIS Freestyle Junior World Ski Championships and won a silver medal in the ski cross event.

2022 Winter Olympics bronze medal controversy

Maier represented Germany at the 2022 Winter Olympics in the ski cross event and finished in fourth place in the big final. Fanny Smith received a yellow card, and Maier was initially awarded the bronze medal.

The Freestyle and Freeski Appeals Commission later overturned this. It was decided that Maier officially finished in fourth place because "the close proximity of the racers at that moment resulted in action that was neither intentional or avoidable". This decision was reflected on the FIS website.

FIS has no right to decide on the return and redistribution of medals, as this issue is in the exclusive competence of the IOC; therefore, in its decision, the FIS Appeals Commission did not mention any words about the medals and their redistribution. The IOC has the last word on this issue. On 13 December 2022 the Court of Arbitration for Sport announced an agreement to share the third place between Smith and Maier with two bronze medals allocated by the IOC.

References

1996 births
Living people
German female freestyle skiers
Olympic freestyle skiers of Germany
Freestyle skiers at the 2022 Winter Olympics
Medalists at the 2022 Winter Olympics
Olympic medalists in freestyle skiing
Olympic bronze medalists for Germany
21st-century German women